Manuel Cadena Morales (born 21 September 1948) is a Mexican politician from the Institutional Revolutionary Party. He has served as Senator of the LVI and LVII Legislatures of the Mexican Congress and as Deputy of the LXI Legislature representing the State of Mexico.

References

1948 births
Living people
Politicians from the State of Mexico
Members of the Senate of the Republic (Mexico)
Members of the Chamber of Deputies (Mexico)
Institutional Revolutionary Party politicians
20th-century Mexican politicians
21st-century Mexican politicians
People from Texcoco, State of Mexico
Chapingo Autonomous University alumni